Jordan Karagavrilidis (born March 24, 1958) is a Czech former professional ice hockey defenceman.

He played the majority of his career with TJ CHZ Litvínov, playing 445 games for the team over 11 seasons. He began playing for the team in the 1976–77 season and after two seasons away he came back to play from 1979 to 1989. He then moved on to play in the lower leagues of Finland, Italy and Germany over the next four seasons before retiring in 1993.

References

External links

1958 births
Living people
Courmaosta HC players
Czech ice hockey defencemen
Füchse Duisburg players
Espoo Blues players
Iisalmen Peli-Karhut players
HC Litvínov players
Czechoslovak ice hockey defencemen
Czechoslovak expatriate ice hockey people
Czech expatriate sportspeople in Finland
Czechoslovak expatriate sportspeople in Italy
Expatriate ice hockey players in Italy
Expatriate ice hockey players in Finland
Czech expatriate ice hockey players in Germany